POLIMI Graduate School of Management was created in 1979 as MIP Politecnico di Milano Graduate School of Business and is currently a non-profit Consortia Limited Company, composed of the university Politecnico di Milano and a group of leading Italian and multinational companies.  

In May 2022, MIP Politecnico di Milano Graduate School of Business has become POLIMI Graduate School of Management to further strengthen the link with the Politecnico di Milano ecosystem, with the School of Management of which it is a part, and with the city of Milan.

POLIMI has also released a new logo, as part of the formation of a new visual identity.

The school was the first Business School in Europe to receive the B Corp certification in 2020. The chairman is Vittorio Chiesa and the dean is Federico Frattini.

Programmes 
POLIMI Graduate School of Management offers more than 40 masters's degrees, including MBA and Executive MBA, and over 200 open programmes, along with customised training for companies.

 MBAs and executive MBAs
 Specialising Masters
 Management Academy

Accreditations and rankings 
POLIMI Graduate School of Management, as part of the School of Management of Politecnico di Milano, holds the “Triple Crown”  ̶  namely the three most prestigious international awards for Business Schools, EQUIS, AMBA and AACSB.

Financial Times Online MBA Ranking 2022 – 4th in Europe, 6th worldwide 
QS Distance Online MBA 2022 – 11th worldwide 
Bloomberg Businessweek Ranking – 22nd in Europe (full-time MBA)
Financial Times European Business School Ranking 2022 – 31st
The Economist Ranking - 86th worldwide (full-time MBA)

Campuses 
Starting from the Bovisa campus, the nerve centre of the School, POLIMI Graduate School of Management has expanded nationally, to local hubs in the Veneto and Lazio regions.

Milan – Bovisa Campus

The Bovisa Campus has been housing MIP, now POLIMI GSoM since 2009. Moreover, in the framework of an agreement between the Municipality of Milan and the Politecnico di Milano, the Bovisa-Goccia area is to be regenerated.

Milan – Navigli Campus 

A new campus in the heart of Milan, in addition to the main Bovisa Campus, has been recently inaugurated.  

Rome - John Cabot University

POLIMI GSoM and John Cabot University, the main American University in Italy, accredited by the Middle States Association of Colleges and Schools, have come together. 

Treviso  ̶  La Salle International Campus

POLIMI GSoM and La Salle International Campus have signed a partnership for the joint delivery of training programmes to recent graduates, professionals, companies and managers in the Veneto region.

References

Education in Milan
Business schools in Italy
1979 establishments in Italy